The Lukiiko is the Parliament of the Kingdom of Busoga.

The Lukiiko arose out of British efforts to govern Busoga, which had previously been highly decentralised. The first Lukiiko met at Bukaleba in 1894. Prince Kisira, the Zibondo of Bulamogi was elected chairman of the first Busoga Council by the eleven hereditary chiefs. He presided over the council until his death in 1898. The role of the Lukiiko was then formalised during the formation of the confederacy of Busoga in July 1906.

See also 
 Kyabazinga of Busoga

References  
 

Busoga
Legislatures of country subdivisions
Politics of Uganda